The Franjo Tuđman Bridge is a  bridge over Drava River located in Osijek, Croatia. It connects Osijek and Slavonia with Baranja.

History  

In 1962 a vehicular bridge over Drava River was built in Osijek. It was in use until 1991 when it was demolished in the Croatian War of Independence, battle of Osijek.

In 1993 the cornerstone was laid for a new bridge. The initiator of this project was Croatian President Franjo Tuđman. The new bridge was finished in 1995, in place of old bridge. The opening ceremony was on 10 June 1995, with president Tuđman in attendance.

From 1995 since 2009 bridge had a few names, for example Drava Bridge or Bilje Bridge. In 2009, by decision of the leaderships of Osijek and Osijek-Baranja County, the bridge was renamed Franjo Tuđman Bridge. In 2012 bridge was renovated.

References 

Bridges in Croatia
Bridges over the Drava
Bridges completed in 1995
Buildings and structures in Osijek
Road bridges in Europe